This is a list of notable people from the Agrahari community.

Politicians 

 Neeraj Agrahari, Member of Parliament and Mayor

References 

Qgrahlri